The 1951 Wake Forest Demon Deacons football team was an American football team that represented Wake Forest University during the 1951 college football season. The team compiled a 6–4 record and finished in a tie for seventh place in the Southern Conference.   After 14 seasons under head coach Peahead Walker, Tom Rogers took over as head coach in 1951.

End Jack Lewis and tackle Bill George were selected by the Associated Press as first-team players on the 1951 All-Southern Conference football team.

Schedule

Team leaders

References

Wake Forest
Wake Forest Demon Deacons football seasons
Wake Forest Demon Deacons football